Mohammed Sultan Khan Ghauri is a biologist specialist of Hemiptera.

Books
 The morphology and taxonomy of male scale insects Homoptera: Coccoidea - 1962
 Revision of the genus Orosius Distant (Homoptera: Cicadelloidea) (British Museum) - 1966

References

Year of birth missing
Entomologists